The 1986 Badminton World Cup was the eighth edition of an international tournament Badminton World Cup. The event was held in two Indonesian cities; Bandung & Jakarta. Indonesia won 3 titles while China finished with the titles from 2 disciplines.

Medalists

Men's singles

Finals

Women's singles

Finals

Men's doubles

Finals

Women's doubles

Finals

Mixed doubles

Finals

References 

Badminton World Cup
1986 in badminton
1986 in Indonesian sport
Sports competitions in Jakarta
International sports competitions hosted by Indonesia